Anantha Raj Rayappan Chelliah is an Indian religious leader: since 2019 he has been Bishop of Kanyakumari Diocese.

Chelliah was born on the 7 July 1958. He was educated at  Madurai Kamaraj University. Chelliah was ordained  in 1994. He served at Neyyoor, and Nagercoil. He was consecrated as bishop of Kanyakumari Diocese at  CSI Mylaudy in Kanyakumari District on his 61st birthday.

External links
[Bishop biography | http://www.missionariesoftheworld.org/2019/07/rt-rev-r-chelliah-consecrates-as-bishop.html]
[csi synod | https://www.csisynod.com/deptnews_view.php?Id=6009&cat=C]

References

21st-century Anglican bishops in India
Indian bishops
Indian Christian religious leaders
Anglican bishops of Kanyakumari
Madurai Kamaraj University alumni
1958 births
Living people